ESV Kaufbeuren (ESVK) is a professional ice hockey team based in Kaufbeuren, Germany. They currently play in DEL2, the second level of ice hockey in Germany. Prior to the 2013–14 season they played in the 2nd Bundesliga.

The club was founded in 1946. In the first years, home matches were held on a natural ice field at the Kaiserweiher, before the club's first stadium with artificial ice was opened in 1956. On basis of this professional homestead the team became more successful and was relegated to the German highest league (Oberliga) for the first time. 

In the sequel, the team has started continuously in Germany's highest leagues (Oberliga and Bundesliga) with various interruptions in the second division. In 1997, the professional hockey in Kaufbeuren collapsed when the Kaufbeurer Adler went bankrupt and had to stop gaming operation during the running DEL season 1997/1998. 

With the 1998 new beginning in the lower-league (2. Liga Süd), the team's nicknamed Buron Joker. Since 2009 of Germany's second highest league (2. Bundesliga and later DEL2). Since 2017 the team is hosted in the new Erdgas Schwaben Arena.

Season records

Tournament results

Achievements
2nd Bundesliga champion : 1959, 1969, 1974, 1977, 1980, 1991.

References

External links
 esvk.de – ESV Kaufbeuren official website

Ice hockey teams in Germany
Ice hockey clubs established in 1946
Kaufbeuren
Deutsche Eishockey Liga teams
1946 establishments in Germany
Ice hockey teams in Bavaria